Open Strings is an album by French jazz fusion artist Jean-Luc Ponty, released in 1971 on vinyl by the MPS label.

Track listing 
All songs written by Jean-Luc Ponty, except where noted.

Side one
"Flipping, Pt.1" – 4:40
"Flipping, Pt.2" – 10:40
"Flipping, Pt.3" – 5:33

Side two
"Open Strings" – 15:40
"Sad Ballad" (Joachim Kühn) – 4:11

Personnel 
 Jean-Luc Ponty – violin
 Philip Catherine – guitar
 Joachim Kühn – keyboards
 Peter Warren – double bass
 Oliver Johnson – drums

Technical
 Rolf Donner – engineer
 Willi Fruth – engineer, recording director
 Bernhard Wetz – design
 Anno Wilms – cover photography 
 Hans Harzheim – inside, riverside photography
 Joachim E. Berendt – producer, liner notes

Recorded at MPS-Studio, Villingen, Germany, December 1971.

References

External links 
 Jean-Luc Ponty Experience / Jean-Luc Ponty - Open Strings (1971) album review by Scott Yanow, credits & releases at AllMusic
 
 Jean-Luc Ponty - Open Strings (1971) album to be listened as stream on Spotify

1971 albums
Jean-Luc Ponty albums
MPS Records albums